Saint Adela (? - 735) and her sister Irmina of Oeren (? - c. 716) were possibly two princesses who may have been the daughters of Saint Dagobert II and his Anglo-Saxon wife, but this has largely been disproved. Some have also said Adela was the daughter of Irmina of Oeren.

Family 
Dagobert acceded to the throne of Austrasia at the age of seven, upon the death of Sigebert III, but was quickly deposed. Dagobert fled to Ireland and returned to Metz in 673 and claimed the throne. During exile, some have said he married an Anglo-Saxon princess named Matilda (or Mechthilde) and had five children, with saints Adela and Irmina among them. However, this story is now believed by many to have been a fabrication.

Life 
Adela was married and had a child by her husband, Alberic.  Alberic died within a few years of the marriage.  Despite multiple marriage offers, she chose to take up religious life.  She founded the convent of Palatiolum in lands that were then undeveloped outside of Trier.  The site later developed into the town of Pfalzel.  She was the second abbess of this convent, after the archbishop' sister Severa, and died on December 24, 735.

Some sources record that she was the grandmother of Gregory of Utrecht. 

She shares the feast day of 24 December with her sister Irmina.

References

Englebert, Omer.  The Lives of the Saints. Christopher and Anne Fremantle, trans.  New York: Barns & Noble, 1998.  Nihil obstat 1951.

External links
 http://www.santiebeati.it/dettaglio/83000

8th-century Frankish nuns
8th-century Christian saints
735 deaths
Year of birth unknown
8th-century Frankish saints
Colombanian saints